Team Sparebanken Sør, was a Norwegian licensed, UCI Continental cycling team, based in Grimstad, Norway. The team consisted of eleven competitive riders. Grimstad resident and former professional cyclist, Thor Hushovd, owned the team.

The team's directeur sportifs were Atle Kvålsvoll and Olav Aleksander Benjaminsen.

The team disbanded at the end of the 2017 season.

Major wins
2015
Stage 3 East Bohemia Tour, Fridtjof Røinås
Fyen Rundt, Andreas Vangstad
Stage 5 Tour of Norway, Andreas Vangstad

2016
Ringerike GP, Trond Trondsen
Sundvolden GP, Andreas Vangstad
Stage 3 Tour du Loir et Cher E Provost, Fridtjof Røinås

2017
Overall Baltic Chain Tour, Herman Dahl
Stages 3 & 4, Herman Dahl
Prologue Troféu Joaquim Agostinho, Andreas Vangstad

Sponsors
Plussbank is a local savings bank based in southern Norway. Plussbank, as the general sponsor of the cycling team, provides the team with its name, alongside their cycling sponsor, BMC.

Team roster

References

External links
 

UCI Continental Teams (Europe)
Cycling teams based in Norway
Grimstad
Cycling teams established in 2010
Cycling teams disestablished in 2017
Defunct cycling teams based in Norway